The Taça AF Viseu, generally known as the Taça Sócios de Mérito, is a men's football knockout cup competition held between the clubs of the Viseu Football Association and competed by semi-professional teams.  The competition was instigated in 1976 and the first winners were UD Sampedrense.

Winners receive the Taça AF Viseu trophy, qualify for the Taça de Portugal and a place in the Supertaça AF Viseu. Mortágual are the current holders, having beaten Lamelas 3–0 in the 2022 final. Mangualde are the most successful club with 4 titles.

Format
The cup is open to all clubs competing in the Viseu Football Association leagues. The competition is a knockout tournament with pairings drawn at random. It features two qualifying rounds and two rounds proper before the semi-finals. Teams from Primeira Divisão enter at the preliminary round stage, those from Liga de Honra enter at the second qualifying round.

As of 2011, the third tier of the Viseu Football Association, Segunda Divisão was abolished after the restructure of the Portuguese football league system, drastically reducing the number of teams.

Finals

Total titles won

Total titles won by council

References

External links
Competition page 

Football cup competitions in Portugal